William Henderson (born 24 January 1944) is a Scottish retired footballer. He played most of his career for Rangers, and spent the latter part of his career with Sheffield Wednesday, in Hong Kong with Hong Kong Rangers and with Airdrieonians. He also featured at international level for Scotland.

Henderson made his career debut in 1960 at the age of 16. He was a very pacy right-winger, and as he was only 5 feet 4 inches tall he became known as Wee Willie.

Playing career

Club
During his time with Rangers he made over 400 appearances and won two Scottish league championships, the Scottish Cup four times and the League Cup twice, including a treble in 1963–64. He was also part of the Rangers team that got to the final of the European Cup Winners' Cup in 1966–67 and was part of the campaign that eventually brought the trophy to Ibrox in the 1971–72 season; however, he was not involved in the 3–2 final victory over FC Dinamo Moscow in Barcelona in May 1972 as he had left Rangers just prior, having fallen out with manager Willie Waddell. Henderson later admitted that missing that game was one of the worst moments of his career. Thus while he sat on a beach in South Africa, his former teammates had their names carved onto the trophy.

Henderson signed for Sheffield Wednesday for the 1972–73 season and made his debut on 12 August 1972 in a 3–0 victory over Fulham. He was a great favourite with the Wednesday fans in the two seasons that he was there even though the club had little success. He made 50 appearances for Wednesday with six as substitute, scoring five goals in his two seasons there. His last appearance for the club was on 27 April 1974, the last match of the 1973–74 season against Bolton Wanderers, a match Wednesday had to win to avoid relegation to Division Three – they won the match 1–0. Henderson left Wednesday at the end of that season and went to play for Hong Kong Rangers. In November 1976, he moved to Caroline Hill. He spent three years in the colony and captained the Hong Kong League XI (a team made up of foreign professionals plying their trade in Hong Kong) before returning to Scotland for a final season with Airdrieonians.

International
He made his debut for Scotland on 20 October 1962, against Wales in a 3–2 victory for Scotland, in which he scored the winning goal. He also scored in his second game for Scotland in a 5–1 victory over Northern Ireland. He went on to gain a total of 29 caps and five goals. His last game for Scotland was on 21 April 1971, in a 2–0 defeat by Portugal. Henderson remains one of the youngest players to represent Scotland at 18 years and 269 days, and won more caps than his main rival for the position at right wing, the highly regarded Jimmy Johnstone of Celtic. In an interview with the Scotland on Sunday newspaper in April 2006, Henderson admitted that Scotland's failure to qualify for the 1966 and 1970 World Cups was a great disappointment to him as Scotland at that time had one of the best teams in Europe. "I can't believe that we had so many players who were genuine world class yet we didn't reach the best-ever finals of the biggest tournament of them all," said Henderson. He also represented the Scottish League XI.

Later career
Whilst playing for Rangers, Henderson owned and ran a hairdresser's shop in Glasgow. Upon his retirement he opened a pub alongside Alfie Conn, Jr. in Coatbridge. He later operated a hotel in Lanarkshire and worked for Rangers at Ibrox on match days as a hospitality host.

Personal life
Henderson is short sighted and wore contact lenses. People found this amusing as they would often wonder how good a player he would have been had his eyesight been better. Legend has it that late on in an Old Firm encounter he inquired on the sidelines, "How long to go, how long to go?" Jock Stein replied: "Go and ask at the other dugout, you bloody fool – this is the Celtic bench!".

Career statistics

International

International goals
Scores and results list Scotland's goal tally first.

References

External links

Sheffield Wednesday archive
Scottish Football Hall of Fame profile

Living people
1944 births
Scottish footballers
People from Baillieston
Association football wingers
Scottish expatriate sportspeople in Hong Kong
Sheffield Wednesday F.C. players
Rangers F.C. players
Hong Kong Rangers FC players
Airdrieonians F.C. (1878) players
Scotland international footballers
Hong Kong First Division League players
Scottish Football Hall of Fame inductees
Expatriate footballers in Hong Kong
Scottish Football League players
English Football League players
Miami Toros players
Scottish Football League representative players
Hong Kong League XI representative players
Scotland under-23 international footballers
North American Soccer League (1968–1984) players
Scottish expatriate sportspeople in South Africa
Scottish expatriate sportspeople in the United States
Scottish expatriate sportspeople in Australia
Scottish expatriate footballers
Footballers from Glasgow